New Hampshire Route 115 (abbreviated NH 115) is a  north–south state highway in Coos County in northern New Hampshire. The southern terminus of NH 115 is at U.S. Route 3 in Carroll north of Twin Mountain. The northern terminus is at the intersection with U.S. Route 2 in Jefferson. NH 115 is also known as Owl's Head Highway, which is named after an adjacent mountain prominence.

Route description
NH 115 intersects New Hampshire Route 115A (Cherry Mountain Road) and New Hampshire Route 115B (Israel's River Road), where it crosses the Israel River. Several hiking trails can be accessed from NH 115 including the Cohos Trail and two trails up Cherry Mountain, each with designated parking areas.  The Agnew State Forest is accessible to the south, via Cherry Mountain Road.

Much of the road skirts the White Mountain National Forest or other wildlife conservation land.

A spectacular viewpoint is located on NH 115 where it crosses the Jefferson town line, permitting views of distant mountains to the north and west, in Vermont as well as the Pilot Range and Pliny Range in New Hampshire. The Mountain View Grand Hotel is also visible, as is the Mount Washington Regional Airport, both in Whitefield. The airport is accessible via the Airport Road intersection below the viewpoint.

History
Before 1970, the northern terminus of NH 115 was moved from the intersection of Stag Hollow Road and US 2 to its present location at the Hollow Road/US 2 junction a quarter mile to the southeast.

Part of NH 115 once followed what is now NH 115A to NH 115B as well as NH 115B to Stag Hollow Road. In the 1980s, the road was significantly simplified, widened and straightened, resulting in a new alignment to the south of NH 115B. The increased speeds of the improved route may have directly contributed to a significant number of tragic moose-vehicle collisions in recent years along that section.

Major intersections

Suffixed routes

New Hampshire Route 115A

The southern terminus of the road is at New Hampshire Route 115 south of Jefferson at Old Cherry Mountain Road. The northern terminus of NH 115A is at U.S. Route 2 in Jefferson at the Old Corner Store.

New Hampshire Route 115B

New Hampshire Route 115B (abbreviated NH 115B) is the designation for an east–west connector between New Hampshire Route 115 and New Hampshire Route 115A, along the Israel River in Jefferson. NH 115B was part of NH 115 prior to the southerly relocation and improvement of that route. 

An RV campsite is located along this road.

References

External links

 New Hampshire State Route 115 on Flickr
 New Hampshire State Route 115A on Flickr

115
Transportation in Coös County, New Hampshire